Billy Monger (born 5 May 1999) is a British racing driver who raced in British F4 in 2016 and 2017. He is now also a commentator/pundit and TV personality. He is also referred to by the nickname Billy Whizz. after the character in British comic The Beano.

In April 2017, he was critically injured after being involved in a collision at Donington Park that caused both of his legs to be amputated, one below the knee and the other above the knee. Until that, he had been heavily involved in kart racing all over the UK and the Channel Islands and then a successful Ginetta Junior racer.

After treatment and therapy, Monger returned to competition in November 2017. In 2018, Monger was awarded the BBC Sports Personality of the Year Helen Rollason Award for outstanding achievement in the face of adversity. From 2019, he supplied analysis for Channel 4 F1. He also competed in the Formula 3 based Euroformula Open championship for Carlin Motorsport, achieving his first single seater race win at the 2019 Pau Grand Prix.

Career
Monger first got behind the wheel of a vehicle at the age of six, when his father, a former kart racer, bought him his first go-kart.

In 2016, Monger joined the F4 British Championship with JHR Developments. There he took three podiums and finished 12th in the championship. He remained with the team for the 2017 season. On 16 April 2017, Monger was badly injured and almost died after being involved in a crash at the Donington race where he crashed at high speed into the back of Finnish driver Patrik Pasma; as a result, both of his legs were amputated afterwards. His left leg was amputated high above the knee, leaving him with a short stump of his thigh. His right leg is longer, being amputated below the knee, and this longer stump enables him to drive modified cars. It was nearly three weeks before his 18th birthday. Pasma was not seriously injured in the crash.

A JustGiving page was set up by his team JHR Developments to raise money for Monger, raising over £500,000 in the first 24 hours. A number of F1 drivers have shown their support towards Monger, including Jenson Button, Lewis Hamilton, Max Verstappen, Daniel Ricciardo, Jolyon Palmer and Nico Hülkenberg.

In June 2017, it was announced that Monger would return to competition in November, sharing a Group CN Ligier JS53 Evo 2-Honda with quadruple amputee Frédéric Sausset in a round of the V de V Challenge Endurance Proto at the Autódromo do Estoril in Portugal, as part of a programme with the eventual aim of fielding a team of three disabled drivers at the 2020 Le Mans 24 Hours. In July 2017, Monger made his return to the track when he tested a Fun Cup race car adapted with additional hand controls by disabled motorsport specialists Team BRIT at Brands Hatch, where he regained his race licence.

In February 2018, Monger drove a single seater racing car for the first time since his crash when he tested a BRDC British Formula 3 car for the Carlin team at Oulton Park. The following month Monger confirmed that he would be racing for Carlin in the opening meeting of the 2018 BRDC Formula 3 series at the same venue. In order to compete in F3, he and his family had to appeal to the sport's international governing body, the Fédération Internationale de l'Automobile, to change their regulations, as they had restricted disabled drivers from racing single seaters on the grounds of safety: the FIA decided to lift the ban in December 2017, allowing disabled drivers to race appropriately-modified single seaters as long as they could pass safety checks.  He finished third at Oulton Park in a car adapted for him: the modifications included moving the brake pedal upwards so he could brake using one of his leg stumps, and replacing the throttle pedal with a lever mounted on the steering wheel.

In June 2018, Monger drove a Formula 1 racing car for the first time when he tested a Sauber C30 at the Rockingham Motor Speedway in Corby. The car had been specially converted to match the hand controls present in the Carlin BRDC British Formula 3 car he races. 

Broadcasting Career
From 2019, he supplied analysis for Channel 4 F1. He also was the co-commentator for W Series. He also works on Channel 4's Paralympic Games coverage and Parasport presenting team, as comentator and reporter.

A documentary feature about Monger's first Formula 1 drive was shown as part of Sky F1's coverage of the 2018 Austrian Grand Prix. Another documentary about Monger's career, Driven: The Billy Monger Story, was produced by the BBC and released via BBC Three in November 2018.

Personal life
Monger is a supporter of Tottenham Hotspur F.C.

On 5 July 2021, it was announced Monger would present Billy Monger: Changing Gear as part of coverage of the Paralympics.

Karting record

Karting career summary

Racing record

Racing career summary

Complete F4 British Championship results 
(key) (Races in bold indicate pole position; races in italics indicate fastest lap)

Complete BRDC British Formula 3 Championship results 
(key) (Races in bold indicate pole position; races in italics indicate fastest lap)

Complete Euroformula Open Championship results 
(key) (Races in bold indicate pole position) (Races in italics indicate fastest lap)

See also
 Alex Zanardi, another open-cockpit open-wheel racing driver who lost both legs in a racing crash

References

External links
 
 

1999 births
Living people
Sportspeople from Surrey
English racing drivers
British F4 Championship drivers
English amputees
Television presenters with disabilities
Ginetta Junior Championship drivers
Carlin racing drivers
JHR Developments drivers
Euroformula Open Championship drivers
BRDC British Formula 3 Championship drivers
English sports broadcasters
British sports broadcasters
Formula One journalists and reporters